Blue sprat is a common name for several fishes and may refer to:
Spratelloides delicatulus
Spratelloides robustus